Armağan Kuş (born 1 January 1992) is a Turkish former professional footballer who played as a winger. He is also a former youth international, earning caps at the U-16 and U-18 levels.

References

External links

1992 births
Sportspeople from Samsun
Living people
Turkish footballers
Turkey youth international footballers
Association football midfielders
Samsunspor footballers
Kayserispor footballers
Bayrampaşaspor footballers
Gaziosmanpaşaspor footballers
Yalovaspor footballers
Süper Lig players
TFF Second League players
TFF Third League players